1980 President's Cup may refer to:
 1980 President's Cup (Maldives)
 1980 President's Cup Football Tournament

See also
 President's Cup (disambiguation)